Real estate transfer tax is a tax that may be imposed by states, counties, or municipalities on the privilege of transferring real property within the jurisdiction.

Rates
In the USA, total transfer taxes can range between very small (for example, .01% in Colorado) to relatively large (4% in the city of Pittsburgh).

Some U.S. states have a variety of transfer tax laws which may include specific exemptions for certain types of buyers based on buying status or income level. For example, Maryland exempts certain "first time buyers" from a percentage of the total  or excludes a portion of the property's sales price from taxation altogether.

Another variation which exists is either the legal requirement to split the taxes between the parties or the local custom to do so.  Thus, in Washington, DC, the 2.2% is generally split between the seller and the buyer.

US States with no real estate transfer taxes 
While many states levy a real estate transfer tax when a property title changes hands, several do not :

 Alaska
 Idaho
 Indiana
 Louisiana
 Kansas
 Mississippi
 Missouri
 Montana
 New Mexico
 North Dakota
 Oregon (most counties)
 Texas
 Utah
 Wyoming

See also
1031 exchange, IRC 1031 Tax-Deferred Exchange
Real estate economics
Real estate pricing
Housing bubble

Further reading 
 Bahl, R. (2004). Property transfer tax and stamp duty (No. paper0427). International Center for Public Policy, Andrew Young School of Policy Studies, Georgia State University.

References

Transfer
Transfer tax